The Franconian Museum Railway (German: Fränkische Museums Eisenbahn)  is an association whose purpose is to preserve and promote interest in historic railway vehicles. Since 1996 it has been accredited also as a railway company.

The association was established in 1985 in Nuremberg.  In this industrial city it aims to preserve the memory of the steam locomotive era.

Until then there was no such institution except the Nuremberg Transport Museum.  The intention was that the association would not only preserve and document steam rail memorabilia, but also maintain historically authentic stock and operate special rail journeys to capture the "atmosphere" of steam rail travel.

Museum railway
The Franconian Museum Railway runs steam trains from Nuremberg on the so-called Gräfenberger Lokalbahn (Grafenberg local line) to the town of Gräfenberg, known as the "Gateway to Franconian Switzerland", 30 kilometres away. It also runs specials in Bavaria.

Railway vehicles 
The society owns the following railway vehicles:

Locomotives 
Steam locomotive 52 8195
Diesel locomotive V 60 11011
Diesel locomotive 231 399
Diesel locomotive V 200 001
Diesel locomotive V 10b
Diesel locomotive MV 6a
Shunter DB Köf III, no. 332 271
Shunter DRG Köf II, no. 322 614
Shunter 323 016
Shunter 323 733
Shunter 323 958
Shunter Kö Typ RL12
Shunter Kö Typ N4
Shunter TGK 2 (former USSR)

Wagons 
Rebuild coach 75 406 Nür
Rebuild coach 75 686 Nür
Rebuild coach 87 650 Nür
Rebuild coach 87 939 Nür
Rebuild coach 88 350 Nür
Rebuild coach 89 203 Nür
Rebuild coach 90 354 Nür
Donnerbüchse 83 485 Nür
Donnerbüchse 84 030 Nür
Donnerbüchse -
Donnerbüchse -
Express train coach 11 544 Nür
Dining car 51 50 88-45 030-6
Makeshift passenger coach 302 313 Nür
Makeshift passenger coach 302 682 Nür
Luggage van 50 80 92-11 789-6
Half luggage van 98 133 Nür
Luggage van 20 80 950 6 902-6

References

External links 

Official Website
Image gallery from the European Railway Server

Railway museums in Germany
Heritage railways in Germany
Railway museums in Bavaria